Deep Lake is a natural sinkhole in Big Cypress National Preserve in Florida. This 90-foot-deep naturally occurring sinkhole lake is the deepest lake south of Lake Okeechobee, and one of the deepest in the entire state. It is the namesake of the community built around it, Deep Lake, Florida.

See also 
 List of sinkholes of the United States

External links
Deep Lake

Landforms of Collier County, Florida
Sinkholes of Florida